The history of Macedonia encompasses various periods of history in a region of the Balkan Peninsula in Southeast Europe, with borders that have varied considerably over time.

For history of the whole Macedonian region, see History of Macedonia (region).
For history of the ancient kingdom, see History of Macedonia (ancient kingdom).
For history of the Ancient Roman province, see Macedonia (Roman province).
For history of the modern Greek region of Macedonia, see History of modern Macedonia (Greece).
For history of the sovereign state of North Macedonia, see History of North Macedonia.
For history of the region of Pirin Macedonia in modern Bulgaria, see Pirin Macedonia.

See also 
 Ottoman Macedonia (disambiguation)
 Culture of Macedonia (disambiguation)
 Languages of Macedonia (disambiguation)
 Religion in Macedonia (disambiguation)
 Christianity in Macedonia (disambiguation)
 Macedonia (disambiguation)
 Macedonian (disambiguation)